Maggot Brain Theory was released in 1994 and is the fourth extended play by Esham A. Smith.

Track listing

References 

1994 EPs
Albums produced by Esham
Esham EPs
Reel Life Productions EPs